The American Wings Air Museum was an aviation museum located at Anoka County–Blaine Airport in Blaine, Minnesota.

History 
The American Wings Air Museum was co-founded by Mike Langer in 1985. The museum was forced to close in 2009, due to an increase in the price of rent.

Collection 

 Cessna L-19 Bird Dog
 Cessna T-41 Mescalero
 Grumman RV-1D Mohawk
 Grumman S2F-1 Tracker
 LTV TA-7C Corsair II
 Northrop F-5 Tiger II
 Sikorsky UH-34D Seahorse

See also 
 Dakota Territory Air Museum
 Fagen Fighters WWII Museum
 Fargo Air Museum
 Golden Wings Flying Museum
 Wings of the North Air Museum

References

Notes

Bibliography

External links 
 Official website, older (Archived)
 Official website, newer (Archived)

1985 establishments in Minnesota
2009 disestablishments in Minnesota
Aerospace museums in Minnesota
Defunct museums in the United States
Museums disestablished in 2009
Museums established in 1985